Halkerston is a surname. Notable people with the surname include:

 John Halkerston, Scottish architect
 Peter Halkerston, Scottish lawyer